Vasilko is a Ruthenian variation of the Greek name Vassilios, English: Basil). Notable people with the name include:

Prince Vasilko Romanovich (1203–1269)
Prince Vasilko Rostislavich ( 1066–1124)
Prince Vasilko Konstantinovich (1209–1238)

Masculine given names